Rajwinder Kaur (born 2 April 1984) is an Indian judoka. She won the bronze medal in the +78 kg weight class at the 2014 Commonwealth Games in Glasgow, Scotland.

In 2018, she competed in the women's +78 kg event at the Asian Games held in Jakarta, Indonesia.

References

External links

Living people
Indian female judoka
1984 births
Commonwealth Games bronze medallists for India
Sportspeople from Jalandhar
Sportswomen from Punjab, India
Judoka at the 2014 Asian Games
Judoka at the 2018 Asian Games
Commonwealth Games medallists in judo
21st-century Indian women
21st-century Indian people
Martial artists from Punjab, India
Judoka at the 2014 Commonwealth Games
Asian Games competitors for India
Medallists at the 2014 Commonwealth Games